Songs from My Heart is the debut studio album by English actress, singer and media personality Amanda Holden, released by Universal Music on 2 October 2020. It is a covers album consisting of mainly show tunes, along with covers of Christina Perri's "A Thousand Years" and Billy Joel's "Lullabye (Goodnight, My Angel)".

Songs from My Heart entered the UK Albums Chart at number 4 and remained in the chart for 6 weeks.

Track listing

Charts

References

2020 debut albums
Virgin EMI Records albums
Universal Music Group albums
Covers albums